Diaphus drachmanni, the Drachmann's lanternfish, is a species of lanternfish 
found in the eastern Indian Ocean.

Etymology
The fish is named  in honor of Danish classical philologist Anders Bjørn Drachmann (1860-1935), the president of the Carlsberg Foundation, which financed the Dana expedition that collected the type specimen.

References

Myctophidae
Taxa named by Åge Vedel Tåning
Fish described in 1932